Springfield Presbyterian Church may refer to:

Springfield Presbyterian Church (Sharpsburg, Kentucky), listed on the National Register of Historic Places (NRHP)
Springfield Presbyterian Church (Sykesville, Maryland), NRHP-listed
Springfield Presbyterian Church (Springfield, New Jersey), NRHP-listed

See also
Third Presbyterian Church (Springfield, Ohio), NRHP-listed